Nista is a small islet of the Shetland Islands of Scotland, situated roughly  east off the coast of Whalsay. It lies to the north of Mooa.

The Trota Stack lies just off the north side of the islet.

References

Islets of Whalsay
Uninhabited islands of Shetland